Catapleiite (•2) is a dimorph of Gaidonnayite rarely found by itself. Its name derives from the Greek words “κατα” (kata)  and “πλειον” (pleion)  meaning “with more” as it is mostly accompanied by a number of rare minerals. When pure it is colorless, but it is most often seen as a tan, brownish-red, light yellow, dark brown, flesh red or orangish in color. It is mostly found on Låven Island, Norway. Its hardness on the Mohs Scale is around 5 1/2-6. It has a monoclinic crystal system.

References

Monoclinic minerals